Ban Wa Tabaek station, or Thap Sathit station is a railway station located in Wa Tabaek Subdistrict, Thep Sathit District, Chaiyaphum Province. The station is famed for having the longest official name in Thailand.

References 

Railway stations in Thailand
Chaiyaphum province